Alexandra Elizabeth Paul (born July 29, 1963) is an American actress, activist, health coach, and former model. Paul began her career modeling in New York before landing her first major role in John Carpenter's horror film Christine (1983). This was followed with prominent roles in American Flyers (1985), 8 Million Ways to Die (1986), and Dragnet (1987).

She is best known for her role as Lt. Stephanie Holden in the television series Baywatch from 1992 to 1997. She has performed in a total of over 100 movies and television programs.

Early life
Paul was born in New York City to Sarah, a social worker from England, and Mark Paul, an American investment banker. Paul was raised alongside her identical twin sister, Caroline, and younger brother, Jonathan, in the rural town of Cornwall, Connecticut. According to Paul, her mother was "a very liberal Democrat and [her] father was a very conservative Republican."  Her twin sister Caroline has been a San Francisco firefighter (where she is often mistaken as Alexandra) and best-selling author. Her brother, Jonathan, is an animal rights activist.

Paul attended the Cornwall Consolidated School, and the Groton School in Massachusetts. At ages 17 and 18, Paul underwent two major abdominal operations to remove choledochal cysts, which left her with a scar spanning from her sternum to her navel. Paul was accepted into Stanford University, but chose not to attend so that she could focus on an acting career.

Career
Paul worked prominently in television from the late 1980s onward, perhaps most recognizable in her starring role on Baywatch, from 1992 to 1997. Paul began her career working as a model in New York City, and later moved to Los Angeles when she decided to pursue a career in acting. Her first role was in the television film Paper Dolls (1982), followed by a role in the independent Canadian horror film American Nightmare (1983). Paul then landed a leading role in John Carpenter's horror film Christine (1983), opposite Keith Gordon, followed by a supporting role in the comedy Just the Way You Are (1984).

She later appeared in the sport drama American Flyers (1985) with Kevin Costner, 8 Million Ways to Die (1986), and the comedy Dragnet (1987), opposite Tom Hanks and Dan Aykroyd. She also starred in the films Death Train (1993) and Nightwatch (1995) opposite Christopher Lee and Pierce Brosnan, as well as the horror films The Paperboy (1994) and Spectre (1996).

Since 1999, she has starred in 15 films for Lifetime Network. She has also starred in the Fox TV series Fire Company 132 and appeared in the last eight episodes of Melrose Place. She guest-starred on Mad Men in 2008. She hosted non-fiction TV shows, including WE's Winning Women and a southern California local environmentalism show, Earth Talk Today. She made a cameo appearance with Sacha Baron Cohen in Borat: Cultural Learnings of America for Make Benefit Glorious Nation of Kazakhstan in a deleted scene parodying her Baywatch role. She did a cameo in the comedy spoofs Spy Hard and Sharknado: The 4th Awakens.

In 2015, Paul won Indie Series' Best Supporting Actress in a comedy webseries.

Paul co-wrote and co-produced two documentaries: Jampacked, a documentary on the world population crisis, and The Cost of Cool: Finding Happiness in a Materialistic World. Jampacked received a Bronze Apple Award and first place recognition at the EarthVision Environmental Film and Video Festival. The Cost of Cool won a CINE Golden Eagle Award. She also produced eight PSAs on the benefits of driving electric vehicles for the non-profit Plug In America.

In 2019, Alexandra acted in three movies, among them, ''Escaping My Stalker'. In 2020 Alexandra appeared in 4 projects, and in 2022 she starred in the independent films Tethered and Baby Steps.

Personal life
Paul has been married to Ian Murray since 2000. She became a vegetarian at age fourteen after reading the book Diet for a Small Planet by Frances Moore Lappé, and became a vegan in 2010.

Paul is childfree by choice.

As an athlete, Paul raced the Hawaii Ironman in 1997. She ran the 2000 Boston Marathon. She has also swum the 11 mile Fiji Swim, the 12.5 mile Swim Around Key West and the 2014 Reto Acapulco 14 mile swim, among others.

In 2015, Paul became a certified health coach and has her own wellness coaching business.

Political activism
Paul is an outspoken animal rights, environmental, peace and gay rights activist. She walked 5 1/2 weeks on the Great Peace March for Global Nuclear Disarmament in 1986.  Paul has been arrested for civil disobedience over a dozen times at the Nevada Test Site between 1987 and 2000. In 1989, she was arrested for peacefully advocating on behalf of people with HIV. She was arrested twice in 2003 for civil disobedience protesting the Iraq War and spent five days in the Los Angeles Metropolitan Detention Center after refusing to pay the $50 fine. In 2005, she was arrested for protesting the crushing of the EV1, and performed 80–100 hours of community service for electric car organizations. Paul's younger brother, Jonathan, is also an animal rights activist, who served 51 months in prison for his role in the arson of a slaughterhouse.

She has traveled to Nicaragua with Operation USA and to South Africa to register voters. Paul volunteered in Sierra Leone with the non profit Population Media Center. In 2006, Paul donated $250 to the Ned Lamont campaign against Joe Lieberman, because Lieberman supported the war in Iraq.

Alexandra was an active member for 9 years of the Santa Monica, CA chapter of Food Not Bombs, where she picked up donations, cooked, and served hot vegan meals to the homeless community every Thursday evening. She also registered voters sitting at a card table on LA street corners for 2 hours a week from 1989 to 2010 with The First Vote.    

She received the 2014 Vegan of the Year by Last Chance for Animals, and in 2007 received a United Nations Environment Programme honor for her contribution to overpopulation issues.

In 2016, Alexandra joined Direct Action Everywhere in an open rescue of several pigs from a factory farm.
In 2017, Alexandra joined a sit-in at an Oakland, California slaughterhouse and was arrested. In 2018, Alexandra was arrested for a civil disobedience action at Sunrise Chicken Farm. In 2019, she was arrested for peacefully protesting at Reichardt Duck Farm and spent two days in Sonoma County jail. In September, 2020, Alexandra and 6 other DxE activists were arrested for trying to rescue a pig from a Farmer John slaughterhouse in Vernon, California. In September, 2021, Alexandra rescued a chicken outside a Foster Farms slaughterhouse and goes on trial on March 7,2023 in Merced, CA.

In discussing her political activism, Paul said:
I am sure there are some who do not like me for my outspokenness and my views, and I totally respect their right to boycott my projects. I actually respect folks who stand up for their beliefs — even if I disagree with them — more than the folks who do not care, are afraid to 'get involved', or who cannot be bothered. I admire passion and commitment. A woman once told me she could not watch those slaughterhouse videos because she 'loves animals so much' and it would upset her. I would prefer to hang out with a hunter who believes he is doing the right thing, than a wuss like her.

Filmography

Film

Television

References

Bibliography

External links

 
 

20th-century American actresses
21st-century American actresses
American environmentalists
American women environmentalists
American film actresses
American television actresses
American people of English descent
Actresses from New York City
Groton School alumni
Identical twins
Living people
American twins
Activists from New York (state)
1963 births